This One's for Ja is an album by American organist John Patton recorded in 1996 and released on the Japanese DIW label.

Reception

The Allmusic review by Stephen Thomas Erlewine awarded the album 3½ stars and stated "Patton has made one of the rare comebacks in jazz, one that does justice to his earlier work".

Track listing
All compositions by John Patton except as indicated
 "Patand" - 7:35 
 "Cherry Red" - 7:23 
 "Steam" (Archie Shepp) - 7:50 
 "No Problem" - 6:32 
 "Syeeda's Song Flute" (John Coltrane) - 5:17 
 "Extensions" - 7:56 
 "Sonny's Back" (Grachan Moncur III) - 4:15 
 "Children of the Night" (Wayne Shorter) - 7:21 
Recorded at Power Station, New York City on December 26, 1996.

Personnel
John Patton - organ
Dave Hubbard - tenor saxophone 
Ed Cherry - guitar 
Eddie Gladden - drums
Lawrence Killian - percussion

References

DIW Records albums
John Patton (musician) albums
1998 albums